The Lemyo River, corrupt from pali word of Lahu Mayi, is located in Burma and empties into the Bay of Bengal at Sittwe. It is situated on the side of the ancient Arakanese kingdom, Mrauk-U Township, in Rakhine State. Lay Mro in the Rakhine language means "four cities," which refers to the four ancient Rakhine cities that flourished by the side of the river.

It flows through Mrauk-U, Minbya and Pauktaw townships of Sittwe District of Rakhine State. It empties into the Kaladan River downstream of Pauktaw.

Two hydropower projects, "Laymro" 600-megawatt and "Laymro 2" 90-megawatt, are being implemented by Hydropower Planning Department under the Ministry of Electric Power No. 1, China Datang Overseas Investment Co Ltd (CDOI) and Shwe Taung Hydropower Co Ltd starting from on 18 January 2011.

References

Rivers of Myanmar
Bay of Bengal
Rakhine State
Sittwe